Riverstone Terraces (commonly referred to as simply 'Riverstone') is a suburb of Upper Hutt in the Hutt Valley of New Zealand's North Island, perched on a hill previously known as Craig's Flat, above the Hutt River.

Although mostly residential, the suburb also contains bush walks, a children's playground, and the suburb formerly harboured a small convenience store. The nearest supermarket is in central Upper Hutt, 4.9 to 8.1km away (depending on where one starts in the suburb). The suburb's streets commemorate the names of notable Upper Hutt residents, including Frankie Stevens, James Nairn, Paul Swain and Cory Jane.

A peak-time Metlink bus service, route 113, services the suburb.

Demographics

Riverstone Terraces had a population of 1,776 at the 2018 New Zealand census, an increase of 393 people (28.4%) since the 2013 census, and an increase of 1,116 people (169.1%) since the 2006 census. There were 582 households. There were 894 males and 885 females, giving a sex ratio of 1.01 males per female. The median age was 37.4 years (compared with 37.4 years nationally), with 387 people (21.8%) aged under 15 years, 291 (16.4%) aged 15 to 29, 987 (55.6%) aged 30 to 64, and 114 (6.4%) aged 65 or older.

Ethnicities were 72.8% European/Pākehā, 9.5% Māori, 5.9% Pacific peoples, 20.3% Asian, and 3.5% other ethnicities (totals add to more than 100% since people could identify with multiple ethnicities).

The proportion of people born overseas was 33.6%, compared with 27.1% nationally.

Although some people objected to giving their religion, 43.2% had no religion, 39.7% were Christian, 5.1% were Hindu, 1.4% were Muslim, 1.5% were Buddhist and 2.0% had other religions.

Of those at least 15 years old, 399 (28.7%) people had a bachelor or higher degree, and 150 (10.8%) people had no formal qualifications. The median income was $53,300, compared with $31,800 nationally. The employment status of those at least 15 was that 933 (67.2%) people were employed full-time, 165 (11.9%) were part-time, and 39 (2.8%) were unemployed.

References

Suburbs of Upper Hutt
Populated places in the Wellington Region
Populated places on Te Awa Kairangi / Hutt River